Sarcodon calvatus is a species of tooth fungus in the family Bankeraceae. It was described as new to science in 1964 by mycologist Kenneth A. Harrison, who initially called it Hydnum calvatum. He transferred it to the genus Sarcodon in 1984. It is found in North America.

References

External links

Fungi described in 1964
Fungi of North America
calvatus